The 2012 Pro Tour season is the seventeenth season of the Magic: The Gathering Pro Tour. Due to major changes in the Pro Tour systems the 2012 season was retroactively made to overlap with the 2011 season. Originally the 2012 season was supposed to begin on 7 January 2012 with Grand Prix Austin, but retroactively the events from after Pro Tour Nagoya on 10–12 June 2011 were made to count towards the 2012 season as well as the 2011 season. The major changes included a shift of the season. Instead of Pro Tour seasons aligning with the calendar year, beginning with the 2012–13 season Pro Tour seasons will be going from spring to spring. Also a major overhaul of the ratings system was conducted. A new bye policy based upon the new ratings system and a new invitation policy for the Pro Tour were introduced. Finally the number of Grand Prix tournaments was greatly increased.

Mode 

Four Pro Tours will be held in the 2012 season. The amount of Grand Prix is still unknown as only Grand Prix tournaments through March have been announced yet. The prize purse of future Pro Tours is also unknown, however Wizards of the Coast announced, that future Grand Prix tournaments will have a total prize pool of $10,000 to $40,000 instead of a flat $30,000 pool that was awarded at each Grand Prix in 2011.

Grand Prix: Austin, Orlando 

GP Austin (7–8 January)
Format: Limited
Attendance: 1044
 Raphaël Lévy
 Pat Cox
 Craig Edwards
 Eric Downing
 Jason Howden
 David Ochoa
 Austin Bursavich
 David Saylor

GP Orlando (14–15 January)
Format: Standard
Attendance: 926
 Conley Woods
 Patrick Chapin
 Paulo Vitor Damo da Rosa
 Stephen Mann
 Gabriel Nieves
 Ben Friedman
 Javier Adorno
 David Ochoa

Pro Tour Dark Ascension – Honolulu (10–12 February 2012) 

The first Pro Tour in the 2012 season is the first to have a proper name. Previously Pro Tours were referred to by their location and/or date. The name Dark Ascension refers to the Magic set with the same name that is to be released a week prior to the Pro Tour.

Tournament data 
Prize pool: $233,500
Format: Standard, Booster Draft
Players: 445

Top 8

Final standings

Grand Prix: Kobe, Lincoln, Madrid, Baltimore, Lille, Seattle, Indianapolis, Nashville, Kuala Lumpur, Mexico City, Melbourne, Salt Lake City, Turin, Manchester 

GP Kobe (18–19 February)
Format: Limited
Attendance: 1117
 Masahiro Hiraga
 Ken Yukuhiro
 Kouji Takeishi 
 Hiroaki Kitahara
 Katsuhiro Mori 
 Hiroshi Ishida
 Yuuya Watanabe
 Takayuki Nagaoka

GP Baltimore (25–26 February)
Format: Standard
Attendance: 1545
 Matthew Costa
 David Shiels
 Jackie Lee
 Matt Scott
 Paulo Vitor Damo da Rosa
 Max Tietze
 Eric Meng
 Adam Snook

GP Indianapolis (10–11 March)
Format: Legacy
Attendance: 1214
 Tom Martell
 Kenny Castor
 Dan Jordan
 Colin Chilbert
 Ando Ferguson
 Caleb Durward
 Pascal Maynard
 Adam Yurchick

GP Mexico City (24–25 March)
Format: Limited
Attendance: 685
 Paul Rietzl
 Humberto Patarca
 Craig Wescoe
 Daniel Hernandez
 Pascal Maynard
 Mario Flores
 Gottlieb Yeh
 Gustavo Nuñez Moreno

GP Turin (31 March–1 April)
Format: Modern
Attendance: 1063
 Antonino De Rosa
 Michael Thiel
 Jose Velazquez
 Alessandro Lippi
 Marco Cammilluzzi
 Yann Blumer
 Alessandro Portaro
 David Progin

GP Lincoln (18–19 February)
Format: Modern
Attendance: 716
 Bronson Magnan
 Andrew Cuneo
 Luis Scott-Vargas
 Samuel Friedman
 Mary Jacobson
 Samuel Karls
 Matt Mercier
 Derrick Rutledge

GP Lille (3–4 March)
Format: Standard
Attendance: 1505
 Richard Parker
 Simon Diaz
 Kristof Benaets
 Tom Valkeneers
 Manuel Mayer
 Jonas Köstler
 Grzegorz Kowalski
 Martin Zimmermann

GP Nashville (17–18 March)
Format: Limited
Attendance: 1037
 Reid Duke
 Todd Anderson
 Kyle Babin
 Josh Utter-Leyton
 Caleb Durward
 Robbie Cordell
 Lissa Jensen
 Shuhei Nakamura

GP Melbourne (31 March–1 April)
Format: Limited
Attendance: 558
 David Crewe
 Geoff Zhao
 Oliver Oks
 Simon Harnden
 Thomas Rafferty
 Daniel Unwin
 Jeremy Neeman
 Hao Wu

GP Manchester (21–22 April)
Format: Limited
Attendance: 1028
 Alexandre Darras
 Mario Pascoli
 Joel Larsson
 Lasse Nørgaard
 André Müller
 Marijn Lybaert
 Ciro Bonaventura
 Adam Katz

GP Madrid (25–26 February)
Format: Limited
Attendance: 1314
 Ivo Grossholz
 David Garcia Copete 
 Guido Sondag
 Fabio Rodrigues
 Christian von Kalkstein
 Florian Koch
 Marco Frantuma
 Martin Juza

GP Seattle-Tacoma (3–4 March)
Format: Limited
Attendance: 1160
 Robert Smith
 Iain Bartolomei
 Jason Huang
 James Nguyen
 Andrejs Prost
 Paul Rietzl
 Henry Romero
 Owen Turtenwald

GP Kuala Lumpur (24–25 March)
Format: Standard
Attendance: 612
 Yuuya Watanabe
 Xin Sui
 Sutti Lee
 Chao Lu
 Sukhum Kiwanont
 Kuo Tzu-Ching
 Kingston Tong King Yim
 Jason Yap

GP Salt Lake City (31 March–1 April)
Format: Standard
Attendance: 1137
 Shahar Shenhar
 Michael Peterson
 Tom Martell
 James Cooper
 Michael Hetrick
 Bryan Olvera
 David Gleicher
 Marcel Angelo Zafra

Pro Tour Avacyn Restored – Barcelona (11–13 May 2012)

Tournament data 
Prize pool: $233,500
Format: Block Constructed, Booster Draft
Players: 379

Top 8

Final standings

Invitees to the 2012 Players Championship 

The following sixteen players received an invitation to the 2012 Players Championship due to their performance in the 2012 season.

References 

Magic: The Gathering professional events